Cô Tô is an island in Cô Tô District, Quảng Ninh Province, Vietnam.

Overview 
Cô Tô is a small island which is a well known tourist destination 
Cô Tô (Coto island) is over 4000 in population

Beaches 
The island has three beaches – Van Chay beach, Hong Van beach and Bac Van Beach.

References

Islands of Vietnam
Landforms of Quảng Ninh province